The culture of the city of Nashik, in northwestern Maharashtra, is centred around Hindu customs and festivals.

History

Nashik Indian People tradition or Hindu culture festival.
Nashik was included also under Ashok's Mighty Empire, it became popular in the era of Satavahana's, Nashik surrendered the British on 19 April 1818.

Festivals celebrated

Kumbh Mela 
Nashik is home to Nashik-Trimbakeshwar Simhastha (Kumbh Mela)– a Hindu religious Mela (fair) held every 12 years. It is one of the four fairs traditionally recognized as Kumbha Melas, and is also known as Nashik-Trimbak Kumbha Mela or Nashik Kumbha Mela. The Nashik Kumbh Mela is normally considered to be the most holy celebrations in Hinduism.

Mahamastakabhisheka 
The Mahamastakabhisheka rituals are performed once in every twelve years on the Statue of Ahimsa, of the first Jain Tirthankar Rishabhdev in Mangi Tungi.

Rath Yatra 
Rath Yatra is the main attraction of Ranmnavami where the bathing of idols, Lord Rama and Hanuman in the Ganges can be witnessed. This auspicious Rath Yatra is celebrated at the Sansthan Shri Kalaram Mandir located at the Panchvati Van, which is dedicated to Lord Rama. The second day of the festival is the most important one, in which a long procession headed by the Pujadhikari is held accompanied by the Rath Of Lord Yama. During the whole procession, the Pujadhikari faces the Rath with folded hands and also keeps fasting from the very first day of the Chaitra month. The festival of Ramnavami is celebrated by the bursting of crackers and pompous lighting which attracts people from all over the world.

Other Festivals 
Nashik also hosts festivals for Makar Sankranti and Diwali.

Religion

Nashik is home to many temples and religious sites of the Jain, Hindu and Muslim religions.
In February 2016, the Statue of Ahimsa, a 108 ft idol of first Jain tirthankara Rishabhdev carved in monolithic stone was consecrated at Mangi Tungi. It is recorded in the Guinness Book of World Records as the tallest Jain idol in the world. It has become a major pilgrimage and tourist destination.
 
Nashik is situated at the foothills of Western Ghats, on the banks of River Godavari. The city hosts numerous religious pilgrimages and festivals, including the Nashik-Trimbakeshwar Simhastha, which is one of four Kumbh Mela fairs. It is held every 12 years in one of the four places in India including Nashik.

Nashik is also known for its abundant fruits and vegetables. The yield of grapes, strawberries and onions in Nashik is among the highest in the country.  Nashik's people are known for their cultural art, literature, and food.

Languages
The primary language spoken in Nashik is Marathi. It is the native language of the city and state, and originates from Prakrit.
 
English is also widely spoken by the population.

The literacy rate is 89.95%, with 93.40% of men literate, and 85.92% of women.

Demographics
The city has a Hindu majority, but many religions are represented. As of 2011, the city was 85.21% Hindu, 8.90% Muslim, 3.18% Buddhist, 1.10% Jain, 1.00% Christian, 0.39% Sikh, 0.17% not stated, and 0.05% other.

References

Culture of Maharashtra
Locations in Hindu mythology
 
Places in Hindu worship